Cervera may refer to:

Places

Cervera, a city in Catalonia, Spain
Cervera de la Cañada, a municipality in Aragon, Spain
Cervera de Pisuerga, a municipality in the province of Palencia, Castile-León, Spain
Cervera del Maestre (Valencian: Cervera del Maestrat), a municipality in the comarca of Baix Maestrat in the Valencian Community, Spain
Cervera del Río Alhama, a municipality in La Rioja, Spain
Cervera de la Marenda, a town in Northern Catalonia also known by its French name Cerbère 
Cervera de Buitrago, a municipality of the Community of Madrid, Spain
Cervera del Llano, a municipality in Cuenca Province, Castile-La Mancha, Spain
Cervera de los Montes, a municipality in the province of Toledo, Castile-La Mancha, Spain
Cervera Mountains, a mountain range in the comarca of Baix Maestrat
Espinosa de Cervera, a municipality located in the province of Burgos, Castile and León, Spain 
Rambla de Cervera, an intermittent river in the comarca of Baix Maestrat
Tossal d'en Cervera, a mountain in Catalonia, Spain

People

Álvaro Cervera (born 1965), Spanish football player 
Carmen Cervera (born 1943), a Spanish philanthropist, socialite and art dealer and collector
Julio Cervera Baviera (1854–1927), Spanish engineer
Luisa Cervera (born 1964), Peruvian volleyball player 
Montserrat Cervera Rodon (born 1949), Catalan anti-militarist, feminist, and women's health activist
Pascual Cervera y Topete (1839–1909), Spanish admiral
Santiago Cervera Soto (born 1965), Spanish politician
Víctor Cervera Pacheco (1936–2004), Mexican politician
Violant Cervera (born 1969), Catalan politician

Other

Battle of Cervera